Cnemaspis aaronbaueri is a species of diurnal, non rock-dwelling, insectivorous gecko endemic to  the Western Ghats of South India. It is distributed only in the Agasthyamalai hill range of Kerala.

References

 Cnemaspis aaronbaueri

aaronbaueri
Reptiles of India
Reptiles described in 2019